The women's 52 kg competition of the judo events at the 2015 Pan American Games in Toronto, Canada, was held on July 11 at the Mississauga Sports Centre.

Schedule
All times are Central Standard Time (UTC-6).

Results 
Legend

1st number = Ippon
2nd number = Waza-ari
3rd number = Yuko

Bracket

Repechage round
Two bronze medals were awarded.

References

External links
 

W52
2015
Pan American Games W52